Damarudhar Pujari is an Indian farmer, social worker, and politician. He is a member of the 5th Legislative Assembly of Chhattisgarh, representing the Bindrawagarh Assembly constituency of Chhattisgarh. He is associated with the Bharatiya Janata Party.

Early life 

Damarudhar Pujari was born on 10 May 1959 in Chhattisgarh, India, to a Hindu family of Balram Pujari.

Posts held

See also 
 Bharatiya Janata Party
 5th Chhattisgarh Assembly
 Bindrawagarh Assembly constituency

References 

1959 births
Living people
Indian Hindus
21st-century Indian politicians
Chhattisgarh MLAs 2018–2023